USS Colossus was a steamer acquired by the Union Navy towards the end of the American Civil War. She was used to patrol navigable waterways of the Confederacy to prevent the South from trading with other countries.

Colossus, a stern wheel steamer, was built in 1864 at Freedom, Pennsylvania; purchased 6 December 1864 at Cincinnati, Ohio, by the U.S. Navy; outfitted at Mound City, Illinois; and commissioned 24 February 1865, Acting Master F. G. Sampson in command.

Assigned to serve in the Mississippi Squadron 
 
Serving in the Mississippi Squadron, Colossus patrolled the waters between Vicksburg, Mississippi, and the Arkansas River until 15 June 1865 when she returned to Mound City.

Colossus was placed out of commission 3 July 1865 and sold 17 August 1865.

References 
 

Ships of the Union Navy
Ships built in Pennsylvania
Steamships of the United States Navy
Gunboats of the United States Navy
1864 ships